The Fifth Estate is a 2013 biographical thriller film directed by Bill Condon about the news-leaking website WikiLeaks. The film stars Benedict Cumberbatch as its editor-in-chief and founder Julian Assange and Daniel Brühl as its former spokesperson Daniel Domscheit-Berg. Anthony Mackie, David Thewlis, Alicia Vikander, Stanley Tucci, and Laura Linney are featured in supporting roles. The film's screenplay was written by Josh Singer based in-part on Domscheit-Berg's book Inside WikiLeaks: My Time with Julian Assange at the World's Most Dangerous Website (2011), as well as WikiLeaks: Inside Julian Assange's War on Secrecy (2011) by British journalists David Leigh and Luke Harding. The film's name is a reference to people who operate in the manner of journalists outside the normal constraints imposed on the mainstream media.

Co-produced by DreamWorks Pictures and Participant Media, The Fifth Estate premiered at the 2013 Toronto International Film Festival and was released in theaters by Touchstone Pictures in the United States on October 18, 2013, with international distribution divided among Walt Disney Studios Motion Pictures, Reliance Entertainment, and independent arrangements by Mister Smith Entertainment. The film performed poorly at the box office and garnered mixed critical reaction, receiving criticism for its screenplay and direction, although the acting was praised, particularly Cumberbatch's performance.

Plot
The story opens in 2010, with the release of the Afghan War Logs. It then flashes back to 2007, where journalist Daniel Domscheit-Berg meets Australian journalist Julian Assange for the first time, at the Chaos Communication Congress in Berlin. Daniel's interest in online activism has led him to Assange, with whom he has corresponded by email. They begin working together on WikiLeaks, a website devoted to releasing information being withheld from the public while retaining anonymity for its sources. Their first major target is a private Swiss bank, Julius Baer, whose Cayman Islands branch has been engaged in illegal activities. Despite Baer's filing of a lawsuit and obtaining an injunction, the judge dissolves the injunction, allowing Julian and Daniel to reclaim the domain name. As their confidence increases, the two push forward in publishing information over the next three years, including secrets on Scientology, revealing Sarah Palin's email account, and the membership list of the British National Party.

At first Daniel enjoys changing the world, viewing WikiLeaks as a noble enterprise and Assange as a mentor. However, the relationship between the two becomes strained over time. Daniel loses his job and problems arise in his relationship, particularly concerning the BNP membership leak, which also revealed the addresses of the people involved, and caused several to lose their jobs. Assange openly mocks Daniel's concerns about these issues, implying his own life has been more troubling. Assange's abrasive manner and actions, such as abandoning Daniel at his parents' house after having accepted their dinner invitation, only deepen the strain further. 

Interspersed throughout the film are flashbacks hinting at Assange's troubled childhood and involvement in a suspicious cult, and that Assange's obsession with WikiLeaks has more to do with childhood trauma than wanting to improve the world. Daniel begins to fear that Assange may be closer to a con man than a mentor. He also notices that Assange constantly gives different stories about why his hair is white. Assange at first tells Daniel that WikiLeaks has hundreds of workers, but Daniel later finds out that Daniel and Assange are the only members. 

Most importantly to Daniel, Assange frequently claims that protecting sources is the website's number one goal. However, Daniel begins to suspect that Assange only cares about protecting sources so people will come forward and that Assange does not actually care who gets hurt by the website, though Assange claims that the harm the website may cause is outweighed by good the leaks create. Daniel's girlfriend tells him that she believes in his cause, but that it's his job to prevent Assange from going too far.

The tensions come to a head when Bradley Manning (later known as Chelsea Manning) leaks hundreds of thousands of documents to WikiLeaks, including the "Collateral Murder" video of an airstrike in Baghdad, the Afghan and Iraq War Logs, and 250,000 US Diplomatic Cables. Assange wants to leak the documents immediately, but Daniel insists that they review the documents first. Later, several major newspapers agree to cooperate with WikiLeaks in releasing the documents while spinning WikiLeaks positively. However, both Daniel and the newspapers require the names in the documents be redacted both to protect sources and to assist in the media spin, to which Assange reluctantly agrees. 

Daniel realizes that Assange has no intention of following through on this promise and is grooming a right-hand man to replace Daniel. The newspapers release the redacted documents. The resulting media and public uproar forces informants to flee from their countries of residence and many U.S. diplomats to resign. Before Assange can go further, however, Daniel and the other members of the original WikiLeaks team delete the site and block Assange's access to the server.

Daniel later talks with a reporter from The Guardian, and the two fear that giving Assange such a large platform was a mistake. The reporter tells Daniel that while Assange may be untrustworthy, he had done a good thing by uncovering secret dealing in the government and business world and attempting to protect sources. Daniel also reveals the real reason for Assange's hair colour—that it had been a custom of the cult he had been part of in Australia—and reports that he once accidentally discovered Assange dyeing it that colour.

It is revealed that WikiLeaks is continuing to leak information (with Assange implied to have either regained the site or rebuilt it), and the Manning documents were released with no redactions. Daniel has written a book on his involvement with the organization on which this film was based, and Assange has threatened to sue in retaliation. Assange is shown to be living in the Ecuadorian embassy in London to avoid arrest on an outstanding warrant for alleged sex crimes. In an interview, he denounces the two upcoming WikiLeaks films, stating that they will be factually inaccurate (having been partly based on Daniel's book). He informs the viewer that individuals are what the government is afraid of and claims that hiring Daniel was the one mistake he made.

Cast

 Benedict Cumberbatch as Julian Assange
 Daniel Brühl as Daniel Domscheit-Berg
 Anthony Mackie as Sam Coulson
 David Thewlis as Nick Davies
 Moritz Bleibtreu as Marcus
 Alicia Vikander as Anke Domscheit-Berg
 Stanley Tucci as James Boswell
 Laura Linney as Sarah Shaw
 Carice van Houten as Birgitta Jónsdóttir
 Peter Capaldi as Alan Rusbridger
 Dan Stevens as Ian Katz
 Alexander Beyer as Marcel Rosenbach
 Alexander Siddig as Dr. Tarek Haliseh
 Philip Bretherton as Bill Keller
 Lydia Leonard as Alex Lang
 Hera Hilmar as WikiLeaks staffer
 Nigel Whitmey as General Thomason
 Peter Nzioki as Oscar Kamau Kingara
 Joseph Muriuki as John Paul Oulu

Production
It was reported in March 2011 that Steven Spielberg's DreamWorks Studios had acquired the rights of Domscheit-Berg's book Inside WikiLeaks: My Time with Julian Assange and the World's Most Dangerous Website, as well as WikiLeaks: Inside Julian Assange's War on Secrecy by British journalists David Leigh and Luke Harding. Spielberg was quick to clarify that he is not involved in any way in the adaptation even though his DreamWorks company would produce the film. 

In July 2012, reports surfaced that Jeremy Renner was in talks of playing Julian Assange, and Bill Condon was in negotiations to direct. It was also announced that Josh Singer penned the screenplay. Later that year, Deadline Hollywood broke the news that Renner was out of the running and the studio was seeking Benedict Cumberbatch instead. Joel Kinnaman was also attached at some point, but reports were proven to be premature. The confirmation of Cumberbatch as the lead and Condon as the director also brought the news that James McAvoy was in talks to play Daniel Domscheit-Berg. McAvoy later dropped out because of scheduling conflicts and Daniel Brühl was eventually cast.

In December 2012, the film's title was reported as The Man Who Sold the World but with the official press release, it was confirmed that the film's title was actually The Fifth Estate.

Principal photography began on January 23, 2013, with Michael Sugar and Steve Golin of Anonymous Content serving as producers. During filming, Cumberbatch had to wear three different wigs, false teeth and blue contact lenses, in order to reflect Julian Assange's physical characteristics.

The film's title sequence, which depicts the history of news communication, took over a year to create.

The film was partially shot in Belgium, as can be seen in the movie poster, which contains the Liège-Guillemins railway station.

Criticism by Assange and WikiLeaks

On January 24, 2013, Assange claimed during a presentation of the Sam Adams Award for Integrity in Intelligence—held at Oxford University—that he had read a version of the screenplay of the film, describing it as a "serious propaganda attack on WikiLeaks and the integrity of its staff", as a "lie built upon a lie", and as "fanning the flames for war on Iran". The opening scene was inside a putative military complex in Iran and nuclear symbols could be seen. Birgitta Jónsdóttir told the WikiLeaks official Twitter account, "the Iran scene has been written out, plus the name has been changed. Come with constructive ideas how to improve it". Birgitta also tweeted that Assange does not possess the latest version of the script.

Julian Assange has described the film as a "massive propaganda attack". WikiLeaks criticised both books on which the film was based as "inaccurate and libellous". WikiLeaks said that the film was "careful to avoid most criticism of US foreign policy actually revealed by WikiLeaks" and covered "almost none of the evidence WikiLeaks published ... of serious abuses within the US military and the State Department". It said the film contained fabrications which had the effect of obscuring the benefits of WikiLeaks' releases and demonising Assange.

Since Assange had been living inside the Ecuadorian embassy in London under diplomatic asylum, he and Cumberbatch reportedly communicated via email during filming.

On September 21, 2013, a version of the script, allegedly the film's screenplay, was released by WikiLeaks, along with commentary labeling the film as "fiction masquerading as fact". Both Assange and WikiLeaks have stated that neither DreamWorks nor Disney approached them for any consultation on the film. Assange elaborated on the matter, "I don't think we are in a situation anymore where an organization like DreamWorks or Disney can succinctly decide that it is going to produce a movie about living people, and living political refugees, and people who are embroiled in a grand jury proceeding in the United States, and just smear, without the cost."

In October 2013, WikiLeaks published a personal letter that Assange wrote to Cumberbatch in January of that year, in which he commended the actor's talent and good intentions, but requested him to reconsider his involvement with the film, which Assange negatively labeled as "a project that vilifies and marginalises a living political refugee to the benefit of an entrenched, corrupt and dangerous state." WikiLeaks described Cumberbatch's reply to Assange as "courteous and considered". Cumberbatch also admitted his reservations with the early drafts of the film's script, believing that it portrayed Assange as an antagonistic person. In regard to his continued involvement with the film, Cumberbatch stated "I wanted to create a three dimensional portrait of a man far more maligned in the tabloid press than he is in our film to remind people that he is not just the weird, white haired Australian dude wanted in Sweden, hiding in an embassy behind Harrods. But a true force to be reckoned with, achieved the realization of the great ideal." In an interview with George Stephanopoulos' show This Week, Assange stated that "Cumberbatch tried to ameliorate the script but unfortunately with limited success... though I'm pleased he tried."

In February 2014, Andrew O'Hagan, the ghostwriter of Assange's autobiography by Canongate, recalled the activist's reaction to the film in a lecture for the London Review of Books. He stated that Assange wanted him to be a consultant on the film and even suggested that OHagan split his fee with Assange.

Music
The film's score was composed by Carter Burwell and its soundtrack was released by Lakeshore Records on October 8, 2013.

Release
Walt Disney Studios Motion Pictures distributed The Fifth Estate globally through its Touchstone Pictures label, except for territories in Europe, Africa and the Middle East, where the film's rights were sold by Mister Smith Entertainment to independent distributors, including Entertainment One Films in the United Kingdom. DreamWorks' financial partner, Reliance Entertainment, released the film in India.

The film opened the Toronto International Film Festival on September 5, 2013.

Home media
Touchstone Home Entertainment released the film on Blu-ray and DVD on January 7, 2014.

Reception

Box office
The Fifth Estate grossed $3.3 million in North America and $5.3 million in other territories for a worldwide total of $8.6 million, against a budget of $28 million.

In its opening weekend, the film came in eighth place with $1.7 million, one of the lowest openings for a DreamWorks release and the worst 2013 debut for a wide release in the United States. The film was a box office bomb in the United States, though according to Disney distribution chief Dave Hollis, the film performed best in major North American cities.

Critical response
The Fifth Estate received mixed reviews from film critics, although Cumberbatch's performance as Assange received praise. On Rotten Tomatoes the film has an approval rating of 35%, based on 181 reviews, with an average score of 5.4/10. The website's critical consensus reads, "Heavy on detail and melodrama but missing the spark from its remarkable real-life inspiration, The Fifth Estate mostly serves as a middling showcase for Benedict Cumberbatch's remarkable talent." On Metacritic, the film has a weighted average score of 49 out of 100, based on 42 critics, indicating "mixed or average reviews". It received an average grade of "B" from market-research firm CinemaScore.

Variety wrote "that it primarily hobbles itself by trying to cram in more context-needy material than any single drama should have to bear." The Hollywood Reporter compared the film unfavorably to The Social Network, adding that "Though it will attract attention at the box office, it is unlikely to appeal broadly to moviegoers who, one suspects, have never been as worked up about WikiLeaks as journalists and governments are." Tim Robey of The Daily Telegraph reciprocated the comparison, elaborating that, "At times, this debt is so obvious that the movie's style feels second-hand: an overeager, slightly shop-worn bombardment of finger-on-the-pulse pop-out graphics, representing the giddy proliferation of voices in the misinformation age by simply filling the screen with text." 

Alan Scherstuhl of The Village Voice criticized the film for hewing "so closely to template that it's easy to imagine that paperclip from Microsoft Word popping up on Condon's desktop one day to say, 'It looks like you're directing a techno-thriller. Would you like help?'"

Owen Gleiberman of Entertainment Weekly praised the film, describing it as "a vintage journalism thriller, a nihilistic newspaper drama for the dark digital age." Peter Bradshaw of The Guardian gave a positive review, noting that the film "sticks to the ancient movie tradition of depicting journalists as untamed, quasi-bohemian wild men, showing up late, gruff and unshaven in the office." 

Mark Kermode's reaction was mixed, praising the film's cast and cinematography, but disliking the direction, writing that "The Fifth Estate feels strangely unfocused, uncertain of how to deal with its slippery enigma." Rolling Stone'''s Peter Travers enjoyed the dynamic between Cumberbatch and Brühl, but disliked the focus of the film's subplot. 

Alan Rusbridger, who worked closely with Assange and is portrayed by Peter Capaldi in the film, describes Cumberbatch as "stunning as Assange. The voice and the slightly jerky, stiff, awkward demeanour are just right."

Accolades
Benedict Cumberbatch won the award as British Artist of the Year at the Britannia Awards for this film as well as for his work on 12 Years a Slave, August: Osage County, The Hobbit: The Desolation of Smaug, and Star Trek Into Darkness.

See also
 We Steal Secrets: The Story of WikiLeaks — a documentary regarding the history of WikiLeaks
 Mediastan — a documentary about WikiLeaks which was publicly endorsed by the organization
 Underground: The Julian Assange Story'' — an Australian television film about his early life

Notes

References

External links

  – official site
 
 
 

2013 films
2013 biographical drama films
2013 thriller drama films
American biographical drama films
American thriller drama films
American chase films
Constantin Film films
DreamWorks Pictures films
Entertainment One films
2010s English-language films
Films directed by Bill Condon
Films about freedom of expression
Films about journalists
Films about security and surveillance
American films based on actual events
Films based on non-fiction books
Films scored by Carter Burwell
Films set in 2007
Films set in 2010
Films set in Berlin
Films set in London
Films set in Washington, D.C.
Films set in the White House
Films shot in Antwerp
Films shot in Berlin
Films shot in Brussels
Films shot in Ghent
American nonlinear narrative films
Participant (company) films
Reliance Entertainment films
Techno-thriller films
Touchstone Pictures films
Films produced by Steve Golin
Films about activists
Cultural depictions of Julian Assange
Cultural depictions of WikiLeaks
Works about computer hacking
2013 drama films
2010s American films